The CRH380A Hexie (simplified Chinese: 和谐号; traditional Chinese: 和諧號; pinyin: Héxié Hào; literally: "Harmony") is a Chinese electric high-speed train that was developed by CSR Corporation Limited (CSR) and is currently manufactured by CSR Qingdao Sifang Locomotive & Rolling Stock Co., Ltd. As a continuation of the CRH2-380 program it both replaces foreign technology in the CRH2 with Chinese developments and increases its top speed. The original 8-car train-set recorded a top speed of  during a trial run. The longer 16-car train-set reached .

Officially, it is the only series of the four not based on a foreign design, and although it was not produced under a technology transfer agreement, there have been accusations that it is based on unlicensed Shinkansen technology.

The other three series are CRH380B, which uses technology from Siemens, CRH380C, with technology from Hitachi, and CRH380D, with technology from Bombardier Transportation.

Development

Development started in early 2008 during the research of CRH2-300 (later CRH2C). CSR Corporation conducted more than 1000 technical tests covering 17 specific areas such as dynamic performance, pantograph-catenary current collection, aerodynamics, and traction performance. These studies enabled CSR to develop technology allowed for increased maximum speed, and the findings were fed into designs for the new-generation high-speed train.

The original project was named "CRH2-350". On February 26, 2008, the Chinese Ministry of Science and Ministry of Railway (MOR) signed the Agreement on Joint and Independent Innovations of China High-speed Trains. The next generation of rolling stock is expected to be used on the Beijing–Shanghai high-speed railway. The project officially launched in 2009, and was included in the "Eleventh Five-Year Plan"'s technology support program for developing technology and equipment for China' s high speed trains.

Designs were driven by analysis of data and operational experience from the Beijing–Tianjin high-speed rail. The Ministry of Railway completed an initial series of system and subsystem designs, then provided CSR Sifang with primary data and design. CSR presented more than 20 design variations. After further optimization, simulation and testing, the final design was published in an official conference held by Sifang on April 12, 2010 with significant changes to traction system, internal amenities and exterior carbody design. A train model was exhibited in May at the China Railway Pavilion in the Shanghai World Expo Park.

In September 2009, Ministry of Railways awarded a contract for one hundred 16-car and forty 8-car new-generation high-speed trains from CSR Sifang Locomotive & Rolling Stock in a contract worth ¥45 billion (US$6.64 billion).

Technical features

According to CSR, the overall design of CRH380A reflects ten major goals.
 Low-resistance, streamlined head. The nose of the train has a resistance coefficient of less than 0.13, aerodynamic resistance was reduced by 6.1%, aerodynamic noise by 7%, aerodynamic lift by 51.7% and the lateral force acting on the head by 6.1%.
 Vibration mode system matching. It also designed the bogie to match the performance of the body and optimized the train body's natural frequencies, which helps reduce structural vibrations at high speeds and improves ride comfort.
This improves passenger comfort when the train is entering and exiting tunnels at high speed.
 Safe and reliable high-speed bogies. The train is equipped with SWMB-400/SWTB-400 bolster-less bogies. The new train's derail coefficient is 0.34 at a speed of  while the maximum derail coefficient of the CRH2A is 0.73.
 Advanced noise control technology. By reducing sources of noise and adopting new sound absorbing and insulating materials, CSR has been able to control noise inside the train.
 High-performance traction system, with YQ-365 motors manufactured by CSR Zhuzhou Electric Co., Ltd and CI11 Traction converters by Zhuzhou CSR Times Electric. The CRH380A has a new power unit configuration to maximize traction power.
 Regenerative braking with a maximum energy feedback rate of 95%. With each stop nearly 800 kWh of electric power can be fed back to the electric grid.

Variants

CRH380A/AL 
The first prototype eight-car train CRH380A was rolled off the production line in April 2010, and tested at the China Academy of Railway Sciences experimental loop line (Beijing loop line) starting from April 26, 2010. Trial runs on the Zhengzhou–Xi'an high-speed railway started on June 7, 2010.

The initial standard CRH380A trainsets was delivered in August 2010, The first test on conventional rail, based on a daily-service mode, was conducted on September 28, 2010.

The test was held on the Shanghai–Hangzhou Passenger Railway.

CRH380A entered service on September 30, 2010 in limited capacity to handle National Day traffic demand on the Shanghai–Nanjing high-speed railway line.

On October 26, 2010, CRH380A entered regular service at the Shanghai–Hangzhou passenger railway and Shanghai–Nanjing intercity railway. The maximum operational speed reaches , and this is always restricted by the software of the computerized control system. The travel time between Shanghai and Hangzhou reduced from 1 hour 18 minutes to 45 minutes. and travel time between Nanjing and Hangzhou reduced from 3 hours 19 minutes to 2 hours 48 minutes.

CRH380A started daily service at the Wuhan–Guangzhou high-speed railway as of December 3, 2010.

The CRH380AL is the 16 car version of the CRH380A. The first set of CRH380AL, series number CRH380A-6041L, rolled off line by October 2010. On November 8, 2010, the 16-car train was sent to Beijing loop line for test. On November 20, 2010, the train was sent to Beijing–Shanghai high-speed railway for trial run. On November 26, 2010, the first  test run at the Beijing–Shanghai high-speed railway was launched at Zaozhuang - Bengbu section.

MTR CRH380A 
On April 18, 2012, the MTR ordered nine CRH380A train sets for Guangzhou–Shenzhen–Hong Kong Express Rail Link, designated as Vibrant Express.

Train series number
 CRH380A : CRH380A-2501 ～ CRH380A-2540 and CRH380A-2641 ～ CRH380A-2925.
 CRH380AL : CRH380AL-2541 ～ CRH380A-2640.

Formation 

Each CRH380A has eight coaches, units with standard compartments were formed as follows:

Power Destination
 M - Motor car
 T - Trailer car
 C - Driver cabin
 P - Pantograph

Coach Type
 SW - Business Class Coach
 ZY - First Class Coach
 ZE - Second Class Coach
 CA - Buffet Car
 ZEC - Second Class Coach / Buffet Car
 ZYG - First Class Coach / Sightseeing Car
 ZEG - Second Class Coach / Sightseeing Car
 ZYT - First Class / Premier Coach
 ZET - Second Class / Premier Coach
 ZYS - First Class / Business Coach
 ZES - Second Class / Business Coach

CRH380A 

  Train No. CRH380A-2501 to CRH380A-2540
  Train No. CRH380A-2641 to CRH380A-2807, CRH380A-2809 to CRH380A-2827, CRH380A-2829 to CRH380A-2901

CRH380AL 

  Train No. CRH380AL-2541 to CRH380AL-2570
  Train No. CRH380AL-2571 to CRH380AL-2640

Distribution 
As of August 2017, there are 443 CRH380A series EMU in service. Three of these sets are testing trains.

Criticism
Kawasaki Heavy Industries claims the trains design was Shinkansen derived without citation to the previous technology.

See also
 China Railway CRH1
 China Railway CRH2
 China Railway CRH3
 China Railway CRH5
 China Railway CRH6
 China Railway comprehensive inspection trains
 Vibrant Express
 Fuxing (train)
 Fastest trains in China
 List of high-speed trains

References

External links
 

CRRC multiple units
High-speed trains of China
Electric multiple units of China
Passenger trains running at least at 350 km/h in commercial operations
Passenger trains running at least at 300 km/h in commercial operations
25 kV AC multiple units